Salinas chub (Gila modesta) is a species of fish in the family Cyprinidae. It is found only in Mexico, classified as endangered.

References
  
 

Chubs (fish)
Gila (fish)
Endemic fish of Mexico
Freshwater fish of Mexico
Endangered biota of Mexico
Salinas chub
Fish described in 1881
Taxonomy articles created by Polbot